Ust-Omchug is an urban locality (an urban-type settlement) and the administrative center of Tenkinsky District of Magadan Oblast, Russia, located at the  mark of the  highway to the northwest of Magadan. Population:

History
Urban-type settlement status was granted to Ust-Omchug in 1953.

They are Butugichag and Lower Butugichag. The settlements were part of the Soviet correctional system of GULAG.

Economy
There is an ore-mining and processing plant, a mining equipment repair shop, a timber industry company, and a poultry farming sovkhoz.

Climate
Ust-Omchug has a very cold subarctic climate (Köppen climate classification Dfc). Winters are prolonged and very cold, with up to eight months of sub-zero maximum daily temperatures, such that the soil remains permanently frozen. Permafrost and tundra cover most of the region.

<div style="width:80%; clear:left">

</div style>

Gallery

References

Urban-type settlements in Magadan Oblast